HD 74389 is a double star system approximately 425 light years from Earth. The primary, HD 74389 A, was initially listed in the Hipparcos catalog as an A0V spectral type star, but this was subsequently updated in 1990 as A2V when Sanduleak and Pesch imaged it with the Burrell Schmidt telescope at Kitt Peak.

The primary component is a white A-type main sequence star with an apparent magnitude of +7.48. Its furthest companion, HD 74389 B, is a DA-type white dwarf located 20.11 arcseconds west of—at least 190 AU from—HD 74389 A, and has a V magnitude of 14.62.

On August 4, 2016, NASA's Goddard Space Flight Center announced that its citizen science program, Disk Detective, discovered a debris disk orbiting the primary, making this the first disk ever discovered around a star with a companion white dwarf. Cataloged as DDOI AWI00000wz, the disk temperature was observed to be at most 136 K. Although stars with white dwarf companions are common, and there are three known planetary systems with white dwarfs as distant companions (Gl 86, HD 27442, and HD 147513), no debris disks had previously been discovered with a closely associated white dwarf.

References

Triple star systems
A-type main-sequence stars
White dwarfs
Circumstellar disks
042994
074389
BD+49 1766
J08454693+4852435
Ursa Major (constellation)